The Wanggong Fishing Port is a fishing port in Wanggong Village, Fangyuan Township, Changhua County, Taiwan.

History
The construction of the port was originally completed in 1969 and was transformed into a recreational fishing port in 2000. In 2002, the Changhua County Government undertook the port re-engineering program to renew the area in order to attract more visitors to the port.

Features

The port includes the fish product direct retail center, visitor center, fresh produce and seafood specialty products retail platform, ecological observation platform, dike viewing plank road and pavilion, waterfront performance plaza, parking lots, harbor area lighting, grass lawns, windbreak trails, restrooms and landscaping next to the access road. The Fangyuan Lighthouse was built nearby the port to navigate the ships coming in and out from the harbor.

Transportation
The port is accessible by bus from Changhua Station of the Taiwan Railways Administration.

See also
 Transportation in Taiwan

References

1969 establishments in Taiwan
Buildings and structures in Changhua County
Infrastructure completed in 1969
Ports and harbors of Taiwan
Transportation in Changhua County